Ci'en Temple may refer to:

 Daci'en Temple, in Xi'an, Shanxi, China
 Ci'en Temple (Zhejiang), on Mount Tiantai, in Tiantai County, Zhejiang, China 
 Ci'en Temple (Hubei), in Suizhou, Hubei, China
 Ci'en Temple (Liaoning), in Shenyang, Liaoning, China
 Ci'en Temple (Guangdong), in Chaoshan District of Shantou, Guangdong, China